Star Hellas is a national beauty pageant in Greece.

The Star Hellas, Miss Hellas, Miss Young title is a trademark for Vassilis Prevelakis and Associates E.E.

George Prevelakis, the founder of the company, was the driving force behind the Hellenic Beauty Pageant since the late 1960s. From then onwards, he was closely associated with the pageant till his death in 2006. In the early 1980s the then owner of the pageant, the Apogevmatini newspaper, decided to pull out of the pageant and transferred the rights to George Prevelakis. George Prevelakis later founded a company (Vassilis Prevelakis and Associates E.E.), together with his son, Vassilis, and transferred the rights to the pageant to the new company. Vassilis Prevelakis and Associates E.E. has been the legal owner of the pageant and is the national director of the well known international pageants such as Miss World, Miss Universe.

In 2018 the I AM ONE Agency Network as the organiser of the Star Hellas and Miss Hellas 2018 competition, provides titleholders with international access to Miss Universe and Miss World, competitions.
It advances opportunities for young women who embody the Miss World mission of ‘Beauty with a Purpose’ and the Miss Universe Organization's ‘Confidently Bautiful’ to inspire young women to pursue their personal and professional goals while making an impact in their communities through worthy causes.

Airing

In the 1970s and early 1980s the pageant was aired every year from the Ellinikí Radiofonía Tileórasi. From 1990 to 2010, it was funded and aired on Greece's private network ANT1.

Because of the Greek financial crisis, ΑΝΤ1 did not fund the 2011 pageant which had the form of a low-key private casting and was not aired. In 2012 the Star Hellas organizers staged a comeback by teaming with Internet site TLife which became
responsible for the publicity of the event and for airing live over the Internet.

In 2018 Star Hellas and I AM ONE as organizer of Star Hellas and Miss Hellas competitions help candidates to build remarkable careers.

International winners
Miss Universe:
1964 - Corinna Tsopei
Miss World:
 1996 - Irene Skliva
Miss International:
 1994 - Christina Lekka
Miss Tourism Queen International:
 2005 - Nikoletta Ralli
Miss Europe:
1930 - Aliki Diplarakou
1991 - Katerina Michalopoulou
1992 - Marina Tsintikidou
1997 - Isavella Dara
Miss Teen World:
2010 - Anastasia Sidiropoulou
Miss Europe World:
2016 - Mikaela-Eleni Fotiadi

Titleholders 

 Winning International Title 
 Miss Universe Greece
 Miss World Greece
 Miss International Greece 
 Miss Earth Greece 
 Miss Intercontinental Greece
 Miss Europe Greece 
 Miss Tourism Greece 
 Miss Young International Greece
 Other pageants: International Beauty Queen, Miss Nations, Miss Mediterranean, Maja International, Miss European Economic Community, Reina del Turismo Mundial, etc.

References

External links
Star Hellas Official website
 

Beauty pageants in Greece
Greek awards
Greece
Greece
Greece